Taneli Siikaluoma (born April 23, 1994) is a Finnish ice hockey defenceman who is currently playing for KISE of the 2. Divisioona.

Siikalouma previously played in Liiga for Kärpät and Ilves, playing a total of 43 games without scoring a point. He also played in Mestis for Hokki, Hermes and IPK before joining KISE on September 25, 2019.

References

External links

1994 births
Living people
Finnish ice hockey defencemen
Hokki players
Ilves players
Iisalmen Peli-Karhut players
Kokkolan Hermes players
Oulun Kärpät players
People from Muhos
Sportspeople from North Ostrobothnia